Clubbing is a graphic novel published in 2007 by Minx, a cancelled imprint of DC Comics. It was written by Eisner Award nominated Andi Watson and drawn by Josh Howard.

Plot
Teenage clubber Charlotte Lottie is sentenced to spend summer on her grandparents' rural country club after an incident involving a fake ID. While working and helping in the club, she discovers a body. After getting involved with a local youth, the two discover that Lottie's grandmother was attempting to summon a demon. After thwarting her grandmother and the local ladies' plans, Lottie is sent to Asia to finish her sentence.

Sequel
A proposed sequel, Clubbing 2: Clubbing in Asia, was written, and art started by Howard, but the imprint folded before it was published or completed.

Notes

References

External links
Andi Watson goes Clubbing, Comic Con International, August 21, 2007
An interview with Andi Watson (cached)
Review at Sequential tart

2007 books
2007 comics debuts
DC Comics graphic novels